Alexandru Scarlat Ghica (? – after 1768) was Voivode (Prince) of Wallachia from December 1766 to October 1768. He succeeded Scarlat Ghica.

References

Alexandru
Rulers of Wallachia
Year of death unknown
Year of birth unknown
Romanian people of Albanian descent